Udo Riglewski (born 28 July 1966) is a former professional tennis player from Germany.  He enjoyed most of his tennis success while playing doubles. During his career he won 10 doubles titles and finished runner-up an additional 10 times. He achieved a career-high doubles ranking of world No. 6 in 1991.

Career finals

Doubles: 20 (10–10)

External links
 
 

1966 births
Living people
German male tennis players
People from Lauffen am Neckar
Sportspeople from Stuttgart (region)
West German male tennis players
Tennis people from Baden-Württemberg
20th-century German people